Jim Tom Reynolds was a college football player. He was a running back for coach Herman Stegeman's Georgia Bulldogs football team. Reynolds was All-Southern in 1921, and scored the touchdown in the tie with Vanderbilt.

References

Georgia Bulldogs football players
All-Southern college football players
American football halfbacks